Encephalartos aplanatus is a species of cycad in Eswatini.

Description
It is an acaule plant. Each plant has 2-8 leaves 350 cm long, dark green in color, erect when young, while as they age they tend to assume a horizontal position. The leaflets, 30 cm long and lanceolate, have toothed margins and are inserted on the rachis in the opposite way at an angle of 150-180°. The petiole is equipped with small spines.

It is a dioecious species, with spindle-shaped male cones, yellow in color, 60 cm long and 8–10 cm broad. The female cones, of the same color, have an ovoid shape, are 40 cm long and have a diameter of 12 cm. Both appear in January, in the middle of summer in the northern hemisphere. Both macrosporophylls and microsporophylls have a flat, smooth and glabrous surface.

The seeds are 25 mm long and are covered with a red flesh.

References

External links
 
 

aplanatus